The 2018 Erovnuli Liga 2 (formerly known as Pirveli Liga) was the 30th season of second tier football in Georgia. The season began on 1 March 2018 and ended on 7 December 2018.

Teams and stadiums 

Source:

League table

Relegation play-offs 

2–2 on aggregate, Guria Lanchkhuti won on away goals.

Tskhinvali won 4–1 on aggregate.

References

External links
  
Georgian Football Federation

Erovnuli Liga 2 seasons
2
Georgia
Georgia